Lafayette is the central district of Tunis (Tunisia) which occupies the northern area of the avenue Habib Bourguiba.

It is framed by the neighboring Bab el Khadra from the west and the avenue Mohammed V from the east.

Among the important buildings in the area, we can find the Great Synagogue of Tunis and the headquarters of the Tunisian Radio.

Tunis